A number of ships built in 1918 were named Liberty. They are further disambiguated by builder.

Ship names